Unsolved Crimes is an adventure video game for Nintendo DS, developed by Now Production and published by Empire Interactive.

Plot
The game is set in 1970s New York City.  The player is a rookie detective from the homicide division.  There are eight cases in the game, and one larger case divided into sections which occurs as an overarching narrative across the game. In this case, a former model named Betsy Blake goes missing. She is the sister of the player's partner, Marcy Blake.

Gameplay
The DS offers a variety of things on the touch screen. Memos, evidence, profiles of suspects and movements are done through the touch screen.

In almost every case players must answer queries. These are often multiple-choice. If the player answers wrong they lose confidence from their partner. The game is over when Marcy loses trust in them completely, or when all cases are solved.

In one case, some queries can be skipped. However, all queries must be answered to unlock a case after the player finds Betsy.

Reception

Unsolved Crimes has received a mixed critical reception. IGN called it "a solid graphic adventure with some unfortunate blemishes", praising the "variety of game mechanics" and calling the cases "genuinely engrossing", while criticising the presentation and graphics. GameSpot called the visuals "unremarkable", criticised the use of multiple choice questions which "makes the investigations too simple." and the absence of suspect interrogations, while praising the cases as "quite engaging", the environmental sound effects, and the occasional variety provided by action sequences, concluding "There's a series of interesting crimes to solve in this DS adventure, but uncovering the truth is just too simple."

References 

2008 video games
Adventure games
Nintendo DS games
Nintendo DS-only games
Now Production games
Video games about crime
Video games about police officers
Video games developed in Japan
Empire Interactive games